Munganahalli Narayanaswamy Dinesh is an Indian Police Service officer from Karnataka who currently serving as Additional Director General of Police - Crime (ADG CRIME) .

Dinesh is a 1995 batch Indian Police Service officer of the Rajasthan Cadre and serving as Additional Director General of Police in Anti Corruption Bureau, Rajasthan. He hails from Karnataka state. He served seven years in jail in the Sohrabuddin- Tulsiram Prajapati encounter cases. After his release in May 2014, he led ACB Rajasthan as IG to unearth major corruption racket in Mining department leading to arrest of 1983 batch IAS Officer Ashok Singhvi who was working as Mines Secretary. Also under his supervision as IG SOG Rajasthan, dreaded gangster Anand Pal Singh carrying a reward of 5 lakhs was killed in an Encounter with SOG and Police Teams in June 2017 and his gang was neutralised.

References

External links 
 
 
 

Indian police officers
Living people
Indian Police Service officers
1971 births
Prisoners and detainees of India